Clostridium piliforme is an anaerobic, motile, gram-negative bacterium.

References

External links
 
 

Gram-positive bacteria
Bacteria described in 1993
piliforme